Taylor is an unincorporated community in western Weber County, Utah, United States, located approximately  west of Ogden.

The community is part of the Weber School District and children from this community attend Kanesville Elementary, Rocky Mountain Junior High, and Fremont High School.

See also

References

External links

Unincorporated communities in Weber County, Utah
Unincorporated communities in Utah